Stewart School, Cuttack is an Indian Christian school, located on Mission Road, Buxi Bazar in Cuttack, Odisha. Stewart School, Cuttack was founded in 1882 by Dr. William Day Stewart, a Civil Surgeon based at Cuttack.

History and administration
Stewart School, Cuttack was founded in 1882 by Chennai born Briton Dr. William Day Stewart, a Civil Surgeon based at Cuttack. He was also instrumental  in  setting up a  Medical Schools in 1875 at Cuttack. The school, that started in 1882 was re-christened Stewart School in 1919 after its founder William Day Stewart, a civil surgeon. 
Stewart School began as the Orphanage School in November 1882. Soon, it came to be known as the Protestant European School (in 1891) and in the same year its doors opened to Indian students. In 1910, the school was recognized as a Higher Elementary School by the Inspector of European Schools, Bihar and Orissa. The name of the school was altered to Stewart School, Cuttack, to perpetuate the name of its Founder, Dr. Stewart. In 1924 the school was confirmed in the status of Junior Secondary School and the Cambridge Syndicate sanctioned the opening of a center for Cambridge Examinations in the school. In the year 1974, the school was affiliated to CISCE, New Delhi. Stewart School, Cuttack is an Ango-Indian School and its Principal is the State's only non-official representative on the Inter-State Board for Ango-Indian Education. Dr William Day Stewart  the founder of Stewart and the Medical school passed away on 23rd November 1890 in Cuttack and is buried at the local 'Gora Kabar' cemetery.

The school is under the management of the Diocese of Cuttack, Church of North India. The principal is Mr F.C.North.

There are five Stewart Schools in Odisha under the management of the Diocese of Cuttack. Stewart School, Cuttack, is the oldest among the five. It consistently has students figuring in the top ten of Eastern Indian Indian Certificate of Secondary Education schools.

Apart from the school, there is a college named Stewart Science College. It is affiliated with the Council of Higher Secondary Education, Odisha.

The Stewart School, Cuttack is a Christian Minority Educational Institution, which is managed by the Managing Committee of the School. It is a Charitable Un-Aided Minority Educational. It does not receive any kind of financial assistance from the state either for development, maintenance of infrastructure or towards the salary of the staff. The sole income of the school is from the fees collected from the parents. It runs on no profit. The Stewart School, Cuttack is affiliated to the ICSE council, New Delhi and has received the Minority Status Certificate on 26 February 2009 from the National Commission for Minority Educational Institution (NCMEI), Government of India, New Delhi vide F. No. 1568 of 2008-3415.

Motto
The motto is Domini Timor Prima Sapientia ("Fear of the Lord is the beginning of Wisdom") from Psalm 111:10 in the Bible.

Staff and students
The school has 2,500 students and 80 teachers.

Affiliations
The school is affiliated to the Council for the Indian School Certificate Examinations, New Delhi.

Campus and facilities
The school is housed in a complex of double-storeyed buildings all around the campus. It contains smart classrooms, dedicated laboratories, a computer lab, a large centenary hall, a library-cum-reading room, front lawns, and multiple playgrounds.

Student life
Student life includes sports, National Cadet Corps (NCC), cultural activities, school youth festival, monthly quizzes, seminars, debates, and exhibitions on philately, numismatics, environment, and science.

Sports and extra-curricular activities
Every year the school has a sports day in which the five houses participate. The five houses are:

 Bamfield
 Biggs 
 Roberts 
 Young 
 Subhash

There are inter-house competitions including debates, songs, recitations, and spelling bees. All children from the houses participate in the annual sports meet and are rewarded for meritorious performance.

The school has facilities for many games like football, badminton, volleyball, cricket. Every year school selects the players for each game to form a team for inter-school tournaments.

National Cadet Corps
In November 1948, NCC (Junior) was formed in the school and is associated with 1(O) Med. Coy. of the Cuttack, N.C.C. Directorate. The school has the highest representation of Junior Division cadets in the annual Republic Day Camp at New Delhi during the month of January from the Odisha Directorate.

There are nine ranks:

 Company Sergeant Major (1)
 Company Quarter Master Sergent (1)
 Sergeants (3)
 Corporals (2)
 Lance Corporals (2)

Every year, an NCC troop from the school represents 1(O) Med. Coy. in the Republic Day parade and Independence Day parade. Every year until 2000 it won both parades. Other victories are:

 2002 and 2003 both Republic Day and Independence Day parade
 2005 both Republic Day and Independence Day parade
 2006 Republic Day parade
 2007 Independence Day parade
 2009 Independence Day parade
 2012 Republic day Parade

Notable alumni 
 Netaji Subhash Chandra Bose – founder of the Indian National Army; born in Cuttack; studied in the school till class seven. 
 Ananta Narayan Singh Deo - Politician, Former royal scion of Dharakote
 Ajit Jain - Vice Chairman of Insurance Operations for Berkshire Hathaway
 Ranjib Biswal - former Indian cricketer and the former Chairman of Indian Premier League

See also

 Christianity in Odisha
 Education in Odisha
 List of schools in Odisha

External links
 , the school's official website
 , the website of the Cuttack Diocese

Church of North India schools
Christian schools in Odisha
Education in Cuttack
Educational institutions established in 1882
1882 establishments in India